{{safesubst:#invoke:RfD||2=Nepalese diaspora|month = March
|day =  4
|year = 2023
|time = 22:28
|timestamp = 20230304222854

|content=
REDIRECT Demographics of Nepal#Nepalese diaspora 

}}